The 3rd Golden Melody Awards ceremony was held at the Sun Yat-sen Memorial Hall in Taipei on 9 November 1991.

Winners and nominees

Song of the Year
Marching Forward (向前走) — Lim Giong
一枝擔竿
凡人歌 — Jonathan Lee
心肝寶貝
I Am A Little Bird (我是一隻小小鳥) — Chao Chuan
故鄉
Crying Sand (哭砂) – Tracy Huang
特別的愛給特別的你 — Sky Wu
粉墨登場 — Chao Chuan
嘸通嫌台灣

Best Male Vocalist Mandarin
Chao Chuan
Jonathan Lee
Wakin Chau
Jacky Wu
Angus Tung

Best Female Vocalist Mandarin
Sarah Chen
Wu Zhenhui (吴贞慧)
Kao Chin Su-mei
Sammi Kao
Cai Xingjuan (蔡幸娟)

References

External links
  3rd Golden Melody Awards nominees
  3rd Golden Melody Awards winners

Golden Melody Awards
Golden Melody Awards
Golden Melody Awards
Golden Melody Awards